Flotidae is a family of pelagic polychaete worms, sometimes synonymized with Flabelligeridae, which they closely resemble. Other sources consider them the sister taxon to Flabelligeridae and closely allied to the latter group.

Taxonomy 
Flotidae originally contained one genus, Flota, from which it derives its name, but a 2007 study also placed Buskiella in the family, and moved all (two) Flota species to Buskiella. The family would thus contains one genus and three species, listed below.

 Buskiella abyssorum McIntoch, 1885
 Buskiella flabelligera (Hartman, 1967) formerly Flota flabelligera
 Buskiella vitjasi (Buzhinskaja, 1977) formerly Flota vitjasi

Similarities and differences with Flabelligeridae 
A 2008 paper analyzing the phylogenetics of flotid polychaetes found that flotids are nested within Flabelligeridae. However, defenders of the separate family status of Flotidae cite several morphological differences.

References 

Polychaetes
Annelid families